Zapogon evermanni, Evermann's cardinalfish, is a species of cardinalfish native to tropical reefs in the Indian and Pacific Oceans and the western Atlantic Ocean.

It occurs deep in reef caves, where it swims along the ceilings upside-down.

The specific name honors the American ichthyologist Barton Warren Evermann (1853-1932), of the U.S. Bureau of Fisheries.

References

Apogoninae
Fish described in 1904
Fish of the Atlantic Ocean
Fish of the Indian Ocean
Fish of the Pacific Ocean
Taxa named by David Starr Jordan